Dame Sharon Michele White, Lady Chote,  (born 21 April 1967) is a British businesswoman.  She is currently Chair of the John Lewis Partnership, having previously held a variety of roles in the Civil Service. 

She was the Chief Executive of the British media regulator Ofcom from March 2015 to November 2019, and was Second Permanent Secretary at HM Treasury from 2013 to 2015. She was the first black person, and the second woman, to become a Permanent Secretary at the Treasury.

Early life
White was born in east London and brought up in Leyton, where she attended Connaught School for Girls. Her parents emigrated to the UK from Jamaica in the 1950s, when her father was aged 15 and her mother 11. White attended Fitzwilliam College, Cambridge, from where she received a BA degree in economics. She later earned an MSc in economics from University College London.

Career
White worked for a church in Birmingham before joining the British civil service in 1989. She worked first at the Treasury and later for the British Embassy in Washington, which was where she met her husband Robert Chote. She also worked at the 10 Downing Street policy unit during the Blair government, at the World Bank, and as a director general at the Department for International Development in 2003–09 and then at the Ministry of Justice in 2009–11, and also at the Department for Work and Pensions.

At the Treasury, she supervised a review of the financial management of government and the Treasury's management response to the international financial crisis of 2007–08.  She was Director General for Public Spending at the Treasury from 2012 to 2013, and then replaced Tom Scholar as Second Permanent Secretary in 2013.  She was the first black person to become a Permanent Secretary at the Treasury, and the second woman after Dame Anne Mueller in the 1980s.

In November 2014, The Voice named White the 7th most powerful black person in Britain. White has been recognised for her influence as one of the most powerful Black British people in the UK on a number of occasions by Powerlist, topping the 2023 list, as well as regularly ranking in the top 10 since 2016, including second place in 2019 and last listed in the 2020 and 2021 editions

In December 2014, it was announced that White would be the chief executive of Ofcom from March 2015, replacing Ed Richards as the previous chief executive and Steve Unger as the interim chief executive.

In June 2019, it was announced that White would be stepping down from her role at Ofcom to replace Sir Charlie Mayfield as the sixth Chairman of the John Lewis Partnership. White succeeded Mayfield during a meeting of the John Lewis Partnership Council on 4 February 2020. It was confirmed that White will be awarded an annual salary of £990,000 for her role at the John Lewis Partnership, a significant increase on her previous salary, which was £341,700 according to data released by Ofcom.

White was appointed Dame Commander of the Order of the British Empire (DBE) in the 2020 New Year Honours for public service.

Other appointments
White is a visiting fellow of Nuffield College, University of Oxford. She took up the role of Non-Executive Director of Barratt Developments on 1 January 2018.

Personal life
White married economist Robert Chote at the British Embassy in Washington, DC, in 1997, when she was working at the British embassy and Chote was working for the International Monetary Fund.  Chote has been the chairman of the Office of Budget Responsibility since 2010.  The media have dubbed the couple "Mr and Mrs Treasury". They have two children.

References

External links
"RTS Cambridge: Watch session ten, Keynote - Sharon White, Ofcom". Sharon White talking to the Royal Television Society, 5 October 2015.
 

1967 births
Living people
20th-century British economists
21st-century British economists
Alumni of Fitzwilliam College, Cambridge
Alumni of University College London
Black British businesspeople
British people of Jamaican descent
Black British women
British women economists
Civil servants in the Department for International Development
Civil servants in the Department for Work and Pensions
Civil servants in the Ministry of Justice (United Kingdom)
Dames Commander of the Order of the British Empire
English chief executives
People from Leyton
Second Permanent Secretaries of HM Treasury
Wives of knights
Women chief executives